Clubul Sportiv Orășenesc Plopeni, commonly known as CSO Plopeni, or simply as Plopeni, is a Romanian amateur football club based in Plopeni, Prahova County. The club was originally established in 1947 under the name of Metalul Plopeni.

Metalul merged with Rapid Mizil in 1967, was enrolled directly in the third tier and was for decades a constant presence at the level of Liga II and Liga III. In 2004 the club was dissolved due to financial difficulties and re-established only in 2006, after two years of inactivity, this time under the name of Intersport Plopeni.

Despite its good financial conditions for the fourth level, Intersport failed to promote in the next three years, then in 2009 the football club was included as a section of the multi-sport entity CSO Plopeni. Intersport was renamed as CSO Plopeni and promoted back to Liga III after only one year. In the third season after promotion, CSO Plopeni withdrew due to financial problems and enrolled in the Liga IV, where is currently playing.

History

Metalul Plopeni (1947–2004)
CSO Plopeni was established in 1947 under the name of Metalul Plopeni and played for 20 years only at county level, fourth tier. In the summer of 1967, third tier side Rapid Mizil merged with Metalul Plopeni, the new formed entity was named Rapid Plopeni and continued the legacy of the football club based in Plopeni, but at the level of Divizia C.

In the summer of 1968, after a first season ended on the 4th place, Rapid Plopeni was renamed as Metalul Plopeni and won its Divizia C series at the end of the season, but failed to promote in the Divizia B, after it was ranked only 3rd in a promotion play-off group consisting of Metalul Târgoviște, Știința Bacău and IMU Medgidia. Next season, Metalul won again its series, but failed to promoted for the second consecutive year, after a new 3rd rank in the promotion play-off group, this time a group consisting of ȘN Oltenița, CFR Pașcani and Autobuzul București.

Metalul Plopeni finally promoted in the summer of 1971, after obtaining again the best ranking in its series with nine points ahead the second place, Șoimii Buzău. "The Metal Workers" remained a constant presence at the level of the second tier for the next decade, period in which were ranked as follows: 8th (1971–72 and 1972–73), 4th (1973–74, 1976–77 and 1979–80), 6th (1974–75), 12th (1975–76 and 1980–81) and 3rd (1977–78 and 1978–79). The two third places obtained in 1978 and 1979 will be the best performance in the history of the club from Prahova County. Metalul relegated to Divizia C at the end of 1981–82 edition, as a result of the weakest rank obtained in the second tier, 16th place.

The period between 1978 and 1981 was by far the most fruitful in the history of the team based in Plopeni, apart from the best performances, Metalul had a very stable financial situation. Plopenarii were allowed by the communists to take part in training camps abroad, thing that was very rare in that period, especially for a second-tier team. Metalul played matches in Cuba, Libya and Syria, sometimes even in front of 50,000 people. In that period for Metalul also played Marian Spiridion, nicknamed "Jair", Divizia B all-time goalscorer. In the squad were also players such as Ghițescu, Ștefan, Dobrescu, Gruber, Anghelescu, Istrătescu, Savu, Andrei, Florea, Negoiță, Roman or Mocanu and manager was the famous Virgil Dridea.

Prahovenii promoted back after only a season spent in the third tier, but this time they had a spell of only three years in the second division, with no notable results. Subsequently, Metalul proven that it was a team too strong for the third tier, but not enough prepared for the second one, promoting back in the summer of 1987, but relegating again in 1989. After this relegation, the team based in Plopeni remained in the third tier until 1993, period in which was ranked 1st or 2nd, but succeed to promote only at the end of the 1992–93 season. Metalul spent next five seasons in the Divizia B, but again with no notable results, finally relegating at the end of the 1997–98 season.

During the 1998–99 edition, Metalul almost relegated in the 4th tier after it was ranked only 16th, worst ranking since 1967, but had an almost incredible comeback next season, when it promoted once again in the Divizia B. After another four seasons in the second division, in which Metalul had honorable rankings (6th – 2000–01, 5th – 2001–02, 9th – 2001–02 and 6th – 2003–04), the club opted to withdraw from the second tier and sold its place to Dinamo II București, subsequently being dissolved. In this last period spent in the Divizia B, Metalul was also, for a short period, the second squad of Astra Ploiești.

Lower leagues (2006–present)

After two years of inactivity, Metalul Plopeni was re-founded, this time under the name of Intersport Plopeni. Intersport was far from Metalul's performances and never played higher than the 4th tier, despite the good conditions it had, compared to the rivals from the league.

In the summer of 2009, Inersport Plopeni was included in the newly formed multi-sport club CSO Plopeni. In this way, Intersport started to be the football section of CSO Plopeni, also changing its name during the summer of 2010, from Intersport Plopeni to CSO Plopeni. After only one season, with a proper funding from the Town of Plopeni, CSO promoted in the Liga III, performance that was considered an important comeback for the small town, after 6 years of absence from the national leagues. But the financial status of the former "metal workers" was not so good as it was in the past, plopenarii finishing 12th (2010–11) and 10th (2011–12), before withdrawing in the first part of the 2012–13 season.

In 2013 CSO Plopeni, which was not dissolved this time, enrolled in the Liga IV, but never promoted again until now, obtaining the following rankings: 6th (2013–14), 4th (2014–15), 7th (2015–16), 5th (2016–17 and 2018–19) and 9th (2017–18). At the end of the first part of the 2019–20 season, CSO Plopeni is the leader of the series, with important chances of promotion, but the battle seems to be tough, teams such as Tricolorul Breaza and Petrolistul Boldești being right behind.

Ground

CSO Plopeni plays its home matches on Gheorghe Șilaev Stadium in Plopeni, with a capacity of 9,000 people. The stadium's is a multi-purpose one and has main stand that was built on a concrete structure, with a vintage roof, sustained by pillars and 5,000 seats. The rest of the stadium was built on metal frame and it is quite degraded.

The stadium was opened in the 1940s and was renovated and expanded for several times, especially during the communist period (before 1990). The arena is named after former director of the Plopeni Factory between 1952 and 1978, Gheorghe Șilaev.

Honours
Liga III
Winners (7): 1968–69, 1969–70, 1970–71, 1982–83, 1986–87, 1991–92, 1992–93
Runners-up (2): 1989–90, 1990–91

Liga IV – Prahova County
Winners (2): 2009–10, 2019–20

Ploiești Regional Championship
Winners (5): 1954, 1957–58, 1959–60, 1961–62, 1963–64

Cupa României – Prahova County
Runners-up (1): 2015–16, 2018–19

Other performances 
Appearances in Liga II: 25
Best finish in Liga II: 3rd  (1977–78, 1978–79)
Best finish in Cupa României: Round of 16 (1965–66)

Players

First-team squad

Out on loan

Club Officials

Board of directors

Current technical staff

League history

Notable former players
The footballers enlisted below have had international  for their respective countries at junior and/or senior level and/or more than 50 caps for CSO Plopeni. Players selected that had no international  or didn't play more than 50 matches for CSO Plopeni could be considered notable, if they played in the top-flight, considering that CSO Plopeni never achieved that level.

 Gheorghe Andrei
 Iulian Apostol
 Tiberiu Argăseală
 Petre Babone
 Sergiu Bar
 Daniel Bălașa
 Csaba Borbély
 Romulus Ciobanu
 Ștefan Ciobanu
 Stelian Cismaru
 Virgil Dridea
 Marin Dună
 Nicolae Florea
 Gheorghe Gruber
 Nicolae Ionescu
 Gheorghe Matei
 Marcel Marin
 Florin Matache
 Cornel Mihart
 Bujorel Mocanu
 Mihai Negoiță
 Dumitru Pisău
 Ilie Poenaru
 Ion Radu
 Valeriu Răchită
 Viorel Roman
 Valentin Sandu
 Cornel Savu
 Vasile Sfetcu
 Marian Spiridon

Notable former managers

 Romulus Ciobanu
 Mircea Dridea
 Virgil Dridea
 Valeriu Giba
 Eduard Iuhas
 Adalbert Marossi
 Bujorel Mocanu

References

External links
 CSO Plopeni at frf-ajf.ro
 

 
Football clubs in Prahova County
Association football clubs established in 1947
Liga II clubs
Liga III clubs
Liga IV clubs
1947 establishments in Romania